Makowica may refer to:

Makowica, Lesser Poland Voivodeship, Poland
Makowica, Masovian Voivodeship, Poland